Corey Jackson (born 1978) is an American football player.

Corey Jackson may also refer to:

 Corey Jackson (rapper) (born 2006), American rapper
 Corey Jackson (politician), member of the California State Assembly
 William "Corey" Jackson (1977–2011), see Shooting of Corey Jackson

See also
 Cory Jackson (born 1988), American football player
 Corey-Jackson Carter (born 1989), British-American singer-songwriter